The family Notodontidae comprises the "prominent and kitten moths", of which 27 have been recorded in Great Britain:

Subfamily Notodontinae 

 Cerura vinula, puss moth — throughout
 Furcula bicuspis, alder kitten — south-west, south-east, east and west-central (localized)
 Furcula furcula, sallow kitten — throughout
 Furcula bifida, poplar kitten — south and central (localized)
 Notodonta dromedarius, iron prominent — throughout
 Notodonta torva, large dark prominent — rare immigrant
 Notodonta tritophus, three-humped prominent — immigrant
 Notodonta ziczac, pebble prominent — throughout
 Pheosia gnoma, lesser swallow prominent — throughout
 Pheosia tremula, swallow prominent — throughout
 Ptilodon capucina, coxcomb prominent — throughout
 Ptilodon cucullina, maple prominent — south and east (localized)
 Odontosia carmelita, scarce prominent — south and north (localized)
 Pterostoma palpina, pale prominent — throughout
 Leucodonta bicoloria, white prominent — extinct as resident species; possible immigrant
 Ptilophora plumigera, plumed prominent — south-east (Nationally Scarce A)
 Drymonia dodonaea, marbled brown — south, central and north-west (localized)
 Drymonia ruficornis, lunar marbled brown — throughout
 Gluphisia crenata vertunea, dusky marbled brown — rare immigrant

Subfamily Pygaerinae 

 Clostera pigra, small chocolate-tip — throughout (Nationally Scarce B)
 Clostera anachoreta, scarce chocolate-tip — south-east (Red Data Book)
 Clostera curtula, chocolate-tip — throughout southern England, locally distributed in north

Subfamily Phalerinae 
 Phalera bucephala, buff-tip — throughout

Subfamily Heterocampinae 

 Stauropus fagi, lobster moth — south and west-central
 Harpyia milhauseri, tawny prominent — rare immigrant
 Peridea anceps, great prominent — south, west-central and north-west (localized)

Subfamily Dilobinae 
 Diloba caeruleocephala, figure of eight — south, centre and north ‡*

Species listed in the 2007 UK Biodiversity Action Plan (BAP) are indicated by a double-dagger symbol (‡)—species so listed for research purposes only are also indicated with an asterisk (‡*).

See also
List of moths of Great Britain (overview)
Family lists: Hepialidae, Cossidae, Zygaenidae, Limacodidae, Sesiidae, Lasiocampidae, Saturniidae, Endromidae, Drepanidae, Thyatiridae, Geometridae, Sphingidae, Notodontidae, Thaumetopoeidae, Lymantriidae, Arctiidae, Ctenuchidae, Nolidae, Noctuidae and Micromoths

References 

 Waring, Paul, Martin Townsend and Richard Lewington (2003) Field Guide to the Moths of Great Britain and Ireland. British Wildlife Publishing, Hook, UK. .

Moths
Britain
Moths